Typhoon Krosa, also known in the Philippines as Typhoon Ineng, was a powerful typhoon that impacted both China and Taiwan. The 18th tropical cyclone, the 15th named storm, and the 11th typhoon of the 2007 Pacific typhoon season, Krosa formed from a tropical system east of the Philippines in late September. The system became a depression on October 1, and on the following day, the depression quickly developed into a severe tropical storm. Krosa would slowly weaken before making landfall on Taiwan. After making landfall on Taiwan, Krosa quickly weakened into a minimal typhoon, and rapidly weakened into a tropical depression between Zhejiang and Fujian provinces. Krosa transitioned into an extratropical cyclone on October 8. Extratropical remnants of Krosa dissipated on October 12.

In China, Krosa caused large-scale evacuations, but the final impact was minimal. In Taiwan however, Krosa caused 5 deaths.

Meteorological history 

In late September, a new system formed east of the Philippines, leading to a Tropical Cyclone Formation Alert by JTWC. PAGASA declared it a tropical depression and assigned a local name Ineng early on October 1, and the JMA and JTWC soon followed.

It was upgraded to a tropical storm early on October 2 by JMA, receiving the international name Krosa. Rapid intensification took place on October 2 and it was upgraded to a typhoon by the JTWC by midday. As it intensified, it gained a wide, ragged eye and began to track to the west, becoming a typhoon by the JMA early on October 3. It continued to rapidly intensify that day before leveling off as a Category 4-equivalent typhoon on October 4. It slowly weakened afterward before making landfall in northeastern Taiwan on October 6. After landfall in Taiwan, Krosa quickly weakened into Category 1 typhoon as it approached China. Krosa would make landfall shortly afterwards between Zhejiang and Fujian around that intensity. JMA downgraded Krosa into a severe tropical storm. Early on October 7, JMA would further downgrade Krosa into a tropical storm, and JTWC followed suit, as Krosa weakened rapidly. Krosa would parallel the coast of China as it turned east-northeast, and emerged in the sea soon after. As sea surface temperatures were cold and could not sustain a tropical cyclone, Krosa began transitioning into an extratropical cyclone. Around noon October 8, JMA published the last tropical cyclone warning on Krosa as it weakened into a tropical depression, and JTWC followed suit six hours later. The extratropical remnants of Krosa crossed the International Dateline on October 12.

Preparations

Taiwan
Hundreds of thousands of people had to evacuate from the oncoming typhoon. Several flights and transport services were cancelled due to the disruption of the typhoon.

China
An evacuation of 730,000 people from China's Zhejiang and Fujian provinces was ordered on the evening of October 6. More than 600,000 people evacuated after landfall in China, bringing the total evacuees into 1.4 million people. In Shanghai, 8,800 workers had to stay out of the coasts despite Krosa passing well south of the city, and more than 40 flights to Shanghai were cancelled.

Impact

Taiwan
Rains from Krosa caused flooding which led to blocked roads along with downed trees. These blocked roads caused the death of a newborn who needed medical attention.  Another death was directly caused by landfall, while isolated incidents caused by high winds from the typhoon caused deaths of another two people. Taiwan's National Fire Agency reported that a traffic incident caused another death, bringing the death toll to five people. Additionally, Krosa injured 67 people and knocked out power to another 2 million people when it made landfall as a Category 4 typhoon.

China
In China, severe structural damage and power outages were reported in the port city of Wenzhou, and 17 people were reported injured. No fatalities were reported. According to Government of China, more than 7.4 million people were affected by the typhoon. Rains and winds from Krosa caused the destruction of 3,500 homes.

See also

Typhoon Wipha (2007)
Typhoon Bilis (2000)

References

External links

JMA General Information of Typhoon Krosa (0715) from Digital Typhoon
JMA Best Track Data of Typhoon Krosa (0715) 
JMA Best Track Data (Graphics) of Typhoon Krosa (0715)
JMA Best Track Data (Text)
JTWC Best Track Data of Super Typhoon 17W (Krosa)
17W.KROSA from the U.S. Naval Research Laboratory

2007 Pacific typhoon season
Typhoons in Taiwan
Typhoons in China
Typhoons in Japan
I
I
Typhoon Krosa
Typhoon Krosa
Typhoon Krosa
Typhoons
Tropical cyclones in 2007